Loboponera is an Afrotropical genus of ants in the subfamily Ponerinae with nine recognized species. The genus is found in central and western Africa, from Ivory Coast to Rwanda. Little is known about their biology.

Species
 Loboponera basalis Bolton & Brown, 2002
 Loboponera edentula Bolton & Brown, 2002
 Loboponera nasica (Santschi, 1920)
 Loboponera nobiliae Fisher, 2006
 Loboponera obeliscata Bolton & Brown, 2002
 Loboponera politula Bolton & Brown, 2002
 Loboponera subatra Bolton & Brown, 2002
 Loboponera trica Bolton & Brown, 2002
 Loboponera vigilans Bolton & Brown, 2002

References

External links

Ponerinae
Ant genera
Hymenoptera of Africa